The Kentucky Headhunters are an American country rock & southern rock band founded in 1968 as Itchy Brother. The band's discography comprises nine studio albums, six compilation albums, two video compilations and 27 singles. Of their albums, their 1989 debut Pickin' on Nashville is certified double platinum in the United States and Canada, while 1991's Electric Barnyard has a gold certification in both countries. Of the band's singles, four have reached Top 40 on the U.S. Billboard Hot Country Songs charts. Their highest chart peak is the number 8 "Oh Lonesome Me", which was originally a Number One single for Don Gibson.

Studio albums

1980s and 1990s

2000s – 2020s

Compilation albums

Collaborative albums

Singles

1970s – 1990s

2000s – 2020s

Videography

Music videos

Video compilations

References

Country music discographies
 
 
Discographies of American artists